The Kalmar KVD440/441, also variously known as Tjorven or DAF Kalmar, is a delivery van based on the DAF 44, made in Sweden. The vehicle inherited the air-cooled, 844-cc boxer engine and Variomatic transmission from the DAF 44.

In 1963 the then Postverket (Swedish Mail) needed a new vehicle for mail delivery, and contacted Kalmar Verkstad, who developed and built it between 1969 and 1971. On the export market it was simply called Kalmar. In addition to the generous heating provided by the air-cooled engine, to provide appropriate heating for postmen, some units were fitted with a gasoline-powered Eberspächer heater under the driver's seat, with a dedicated exhaust pipe.

"Tjorven" was a nickname given to the Kalmar as its rather frumpy appearance was reminiscent of a contemporary Swedish television character of  that name.

It was right-hand drive for easy driver access to road side letter boxes, and frame-built with a fiberglass bodywork.

Production ended in 1972 with about 2000 built, most of them for mail delivery. The Swedish air force used 12 of them for support functions such as collecting the brake chute for J35 Draken and filling up the pilot's oxygen. They were in use until 1976.

References

External links 

 Tjorven From Kalmar And Friends
 Tjorven from KVAB
 TjorvenWebb

Goods manufactured in Sweden
Cars of Sweden
DAF vehicles
Vehicles with CVT transmission
Postal infrastructure